, more accurately romanized: Deashibarai, is one of the original 40 throws of Judo as developed by Jigoro Kano. It belongs to the first group, Dai-Ikkyo, of the traditional throwing list, Gokyo-no-Nagewaza, of Kodokan Judo. It is also part of the current 67 Throws of Kodokan Judo. It is classified as a foot technique, Ashi-Waza. Deashi Harai is also one of the 20 techniques in Danzan Ryu's (DZR) Nagete list.

Description 
Deashi Harai is one of the basic foot sweeps learned in the martial arts. As with most basic techniques, Deashi Harai has numerous variations.

One common method used in Danzan-ryu Jujitsu is the outside-in method of sweeping an opponent's foot. It is accomplished by initially having a firm grip on the opponent while facing him or her. The attacker then moves the foot to the opposite side of his opponent (right foot to opponent's left side, or vice versa), to sweep the opponent's opposite leg out from underneath him. Simultaneously the upper body must complement this push-pull motion with a great deal of power being generated from the rotation of the hips.

Similar techniques, variants, and aliases 
English aliases:

Similar techniques:
 okuri ashi harai: sweeping of both feet sideways
harai tsurikomi ashi: the foot of uki is pushed backwards by the sweeping foot of tori instead of sideways in de ashi harai
ko soto gari: sweeping if the foot that is planted on the ground and supports (a minimum amount of) weight. De ashi harai sweeps a foot that is not in contact with the ground and does not support any weight. The action of the sweeping foot of tori is roughly the same.
Sasae tsurikomi ashi. This is a blocking action of the foot rather than a sweeping action.

See also
The Canon Of Judo
 Sasae Tsurikomi Ashi
 Okuriashi Harai
Kosoto Gari

References
 Ohlenkamp, Neil (2006) Judo Unleashed basic reference on judo. .

Further reading

External links 
 "JudoInfo.com" Animations and drawings

Judo technique
Throw (grappling)
Martial art techniques